Lewiston School District #1 is the school district in Lewiston, Idaho. It has seven elementary schools, two middle schools, one high school, and one alternative high school.  Established  in 1880 by the territorial legislature, the school district is the state's oldest; it preceded Idaho statehood by ten years.

Schools

High schools
 Lewiston High School (2020, grades 9–12; previous 1928, 1888)
 Tammany High School, (1937)

Middle schools
(grades 6–8)
 Jenifer Middle School (1959)
 Sacajawea Middle School (1959)

Elementary schools
(grades K–5)
 Camelot (1969)
 Centennial (1962)
 McGhee (1948)
 McSorley (1966)
 Orchards (1956)
 Webster (1948)
 Whitman (1948)

References

External links

 

School districts in Idaho
Lewiston, Idaho
Education in Nez Perce County, Idaho
School districts established in 1880